Entelopes glauca is a species of beetle in the family Cerambycidae. It was described by Félix Édouard Guérin-Méneville in 1844. It is known to be found in Malaysia, Sumatra, Java and Borneo.

Subspecies
 Entelopes glauca glauca Guérin-Méneville, 1844
 Entelopes glauca sumatrana Breuning, 1950

References

Saperdini
Beetles described in 1844